Windsor Heights is a city in Polk County, Iowa, United States. The population was 5,252 at the time of the 2020 census. It is part of the Des Moines–West Des Moines Metropolitan Statistical Area.

History
Windsor Heights incorporated as a city on July 19, 1941. It was named for nearby Windsor Elementary School in Des Moines; the school was named for early settler Henry Clay Windsor, whose family donated land for the school. In 1958 Windsor Heights annexed the neighboring community of Crestwood, which added roughly 1,300 people to the city and established the city's present boundaries.

Although Windsor Heights is primarily a residential community, some "big-box" retailers have opened stores here, including Wal-Mart, Sam's Club, and Hy-Vee.

On June 26, 2008, the United States Postal Service gave Windsor Heights its own ZIP code of 50324 that was scheduled to take effect on July 1, 2009. Before that, the city shared ZIP codes with neighboring portions of Des Moines and Urbandale.

Geography
Windsor Heights is located at  (41.604722,-93.711111).

Windsor Heights is surrounded by other cities: Urbandale to the north, Clive to the west, West Des Moines to the south, and Des Moines to the east. Interstate 235 runs through the far southern part of the city, U.S. Route 6 (Hickman Road) forms the boundary with Urbandale, and Iowa Highway 28 (63rd Street) the boundary with Des Moines.

Windsor Heights is divided into two school districts. Students west of 70th Street attend West Des Moines schools, while students east of 70th Street attend Des Moines schools.

Climate

Demographics

2010 census
As of the census of 2010, there were 4,860 people, 2,167 households, and 1,287 families living in the city. The racial makeup of the city was 91.1% White, 3.5% African American, 0.1% Native American, 2.4% Asian, 0.1% Pacific Islander, 1.2% from other races, and 1.6% from two or more races. Hispanic or Latino of any race were 3.7% of the population.

There were 2,167 households, of which 24.7% had children under the age of 18 living with them, 47.6% were married couples living together, 8.2% had a female householder with no husband present, 3.6% had a male householder with no wife present, and 40.6% were non-families. 31.7% of all households were made up of individuals, and 11.7% had someone living alone who was 65 years of age or older. The average household size was 2.24 and the average family size was 2.83.

The median age in the city was 43 years. 19.9% of residents were under the age of 18; 6.6% were between the ages of 18 and 24; 25.7% were from 25 to 44; 29.5% were from 45 to 64; and 17.9% were 65 years of age or older. The gender makeup of the city was 47.6% male and 52.4% female.

2000 census
As of the census of 2000, there were 4,805 people, 2,163 households, and 1,349 families living in the city. The racial makeup of the city was 95.07% White, 1.73% Black, 0.08% Native American, 1.25% Asian, 0.06% Pacific Islander, 0.58% from other races, and 1.23% from two or more races. Hispanic or Latino of any race were 1.58% of the population.

There were 2,163 households, out of which 22.6% had children under the age of 18 living with them, 53.5% were married couples living together, 6.5% had a female householder with no husband present, and 37.6% were non-families. 30.7% of all households were made up of individuals, and 11.3% had someone living alone who was 65 years of age or older. The average household size was 2.21 and the average family size was 2.77.

19.6% are under the age of 18, 5.9% from 18 to 24, 28.6% from 25 to 44, 25.4% from 45 to 64, and 20.4% who were 65 years of age or older. The median age was 42 years. For every 100 females, there were 90.1 males. For every 100 females age 18 and over, there were 87.2 males.

The median income for a household in the city was $55,931, and the median income for a family was $65,536. Males had a median income of $41,218 versus $31,854 for females. The per capita income for the city was $29,966. About 2.6% of families and 5.2% of the population were below the poverty line, including 5.3% of those under age 18 and 3.2% of those age 65 or over.

Education

West Des Moines Community School District serves a section of Windsor Heights.

In popular culture 
The town's Dairy Queen franchise briefly became famous due to a viral tweet by Iowa Senator Chuck Grassley who informed his followers "Windsor Heights Dairy Queen is good place for u kno what." Grassley later informed a reporter his tweet referenced the fact that he enjoyed Dairy Queen ice cream.

References

External links
 City of Windsor Heights
 Windsor Heights Chamber of Commerce

Cities in Polk County, Iowa
Cities in Iowa
Populated places established in 1941
Des Moines metropolitan area
1941 establishments in Iowa